HD 114762 b is a small red dwarf star, in the HD 114762 system, formerly thought to be a massive gaseous extrasolar planet, approximately  away in the constellation of Coma Berenices. This optically undetected companion to the late F-type main-sequence star HD 114762 was discovered in 1989 by Latham, et al., and confirmed in an October 1991 paper by Cochran, et al. It was thought to be the first discovered exoplanet (although its existence was confirmed after those around PSR B1257+12.)

The object orbits the primary star every 83.9 days at an approximate distance of 0.37 AU, with an orbital eccentricity of 0.57; for comparison, this orbit is similar to that of Mercury but with almost three times the eccentricity.

 was thought for a time to be the first extrasolar planet ever detected, predating the 1992 pulsar planets found around PSR B1257+12 and main-sequence yellow dwarf 51 Pegasi. However, now that it has been found to not be a planet, the planets found orbiting PSR B1257+12 were indeed the first exoplanets ever found.

At an event celebrating the career of discoverer David Latham and attended by his colleagues and collaborators, the object was informally dubbed "Latham's Planet". However, this name has no official standing with the International Astronomical Union.

See also
 51 Pegasi b
 Gamma Cephei Ab

References

Coma Berenices
Astronomical objects discovered in 1989
Red dwarfs